Johan Van Herck (born 24 May 1974) is a Belgian tennis coach and former professional player.

Van Herck first broke into the top 100 of the ATP rankings in 1996, when he made semi-finals at the Copenhagen Open and Italy's Campionati Internazionali di Sicilia. In the later he upset top seed Félix Mantilla Botella in the second round.

In both 1997 and 1998, Van Herck was a semi-finalist at the Coral Springs International Tennis Championships.

He had his best Grand Slam performance at the 1998 French Open, where in the opening round he defeated world number four Greg Rusedski in straight sets. He then beat Spanish qualifier Jordi Mas to reach the third round, but was then eliminated by another qualifier, Jens Knippschild, despite winning the opening two sets, from which he dropped just two games.

Van Herck defeated another top player in the 1999 Grand Prix Hassan II, held in Casablanca, overcoming number one seed Thomas Muster.

He represented the Belgium Davis Cup team in nine ties during his career and had a combined 7-5 win loss record, all of his victories coming in singles rubbers. His biggest wins came against Russian Yevgeny Kafelnikov in 1995, Swede Thomas Enqvist in 1996 and Frenchman Cédric Pioline in 1997.

Since 2011 he has been the captain of the Belgian Davis Cup team. During his tenure, the team reached the final of the Davis Cup twice.

Since 2019 he has been the captain of the Belgian Fed Cup team as well.

ATP Challenger and ITF Futures finals

Singles: 13 (8–5)

Performance timeline

Singles

References

External links

 
 

1974 births
Living people
Belgian male tennis players
People from Herentals
Sportspeople from Antwerp Province